The Northern Virginia military shootings were a series of attacks targeting military facilities at times when they were believed to be unoccupied during October and November 2010.  Forensic examination of the bullets left at the various scenes confirmed that all of the shots were from the same rifle.

The Joint Base Myer-Henderson Hall Police Department was among this year's Anti-Defamation League SHIELD award winners for outstanding law enforcement work in deterring hate crimes and terrorism in the Mid-Atlantic states region.

Representing JBM-HH's Directorate of Emergency Services at the Sept. 24 program at Washington D.C.'s National Press Club were DES Director Lt. Col. Kenneth J. Sheppard, Deputy of the DES and Chief of Police William Johnson, Chief of Investigations Chris Miller, Assistant Chief Jennifer Gazdowicz, Capt. Tracie Miller and Sgt. Nicholas Kalenich. The third annual SHIELD awards were presented to law enforcement departments who displayed outstanding efforts and leadership in thwarting five separate acts of hate crimes, extremism and terrorism.

One of those crime-fighting acts involved the joint base police department.

In the early-morning hours of June 17, 2011, Yonathan Melaku was apprehended in Arlington National Cemetery by JBM-HH PD. A search of the suspect and his backpack yielded information pointing toward Melaku's involvement in shootings throughout northern Virginia at various military installations, the Pentagon, armed forces recruiting centers and a pair of rifle assaults at the National Museum of the Marine Corps in Triangle, Va.

While Sheppard mentioned that the award commendation was a team effort and the whole department was praised for their police work, the DES director was highly appreciative of Kalenich who apprehended Melaku.

"He's probably the main reason why we're here tonight," the lieutenant colonel said. "He's the officer who made the apprehension of Mr. Melaku that really led to tying him into the actual shootings. The evidence found on him when he was apprehended was what keyed the FBI's investigation into the shooting at the Pentagon, the museum and the Marine Corps recruiting station out there in Fairfax." Kalenich recalls the night when he halted the Marine Corps reservist turned terrorist who was attempting to inflict additional damage to American interests and property.

"It was about zero nineteen in the morning when I was patrolling Arlington National Cemetery, and we had a BOLO -- be on the lookout -- for an individual who assaulted a DPW worker with a knife," Kalenich started with the story. "So I was in there looking for that individual when I saw a shadow cross over the street by the columbarium. I thought that was the person we were going after. He took off running; I pursued him on foot, and I apprehended him just before he got to the gate. I brought him back to the vehicle, searched him, and that's where I found the ammonium nitrate and his journal with all the writing in it."

Other metro law enforcement agencies and departments also were cited for the Melaku arrest. Joining Sheppard on stage to receive the award for halting the northern Virginia shooting and terrorism spree were representatives from the Pentagon Force Protection Agency, the Quantico Police Department, Loudoun County Sheriff's Department, Virginia State Police, Coast Guard Investigative Service, Prince William County Police Department, Fairfax County Police Department, Arlington Police Department, Naval Criminal Investigative Service and the FBI Washington Field Office Joint Terrorism Task Force Squads CT-1, CT-4, CT-10, CT-11 and the Evidence Response Team.

The United States Attorney's Office for the Eastern District of Virginia was also honored for its work on the Melaku case.

A number of phrases summed up the feelings held by Sheppard right before the issuing of the award. "Proud is a word that describes what I feel," Sheppard said of the honor. "I'm honored and humbled that the Anti Defamation League chose our agency. The SHIELD award is for exceptional leadership in law enforcement, so that's why you have the respective chiefs of police and agencies here tonight, but the credit goes to all of us who broke the Melaku case."

The ADL SHIELD awards annually recognize professionals in the law enforcement field who protect the public against violent acts of terror and hate. The award recipients were chosen by an ADL selection committee of law enforcement executives from the municipal, state and federal levels from the District of Columbia, Maryland, Virginia and North Carolina.

Suspect
The person behind the attacks remained unknown until June 17, 2011 when Yonathan Melaku, a 22-year-old naturalized American from Ethiopia and Marine Corps Reserve Lance Corporal, was found at Arlington National Cemetery while it was closed. He was arrested by JBM-HH Police Sgt. Nicholas Kalenich. A search of his backpack revealed that he was carrying spent shell casings, a notebook containing references to the Taliban and Osama bin Laden, and plastic bags filled with ammonium nitrate, a common component of homemade explosives. He had no identification on him at the time of his arrest. He also left his rental vehicle parked in the woods near the Pentagon. The U.S. Park Police obtained a copy of the rental contract from the information affixed to the car key. The contract had his name listed. With the assistance of the U.S. Park Police and Federal Bureau of Investigation, they conducted a check of his name for a Virginia drivers license. Once police obtained a drivers license number, the Park Police obtained his license photograph. After the Park Police informed him of his name, date of birth, social security number, and address, he confessed to his crimes. He had also been recently charged with breaking into 27 cars in suburban Washington. The investigation of the incident connected Melaku to the shootings, and on June 23, 2011, he was charged with two counts of willfully injuring the property of the United States, for which he faces up to 20 years in prison, and two counts of using a firearm during a violent crime, for which he faces up to a life sentence, with more charges possible.

The Federal Bureau of Investigation worked with the Fairfax County Police, the Prince William County police and the Pentagon Force Protection Agency to investigate the case.

On January 11, 2013, Melaku was sentenced to 25 years in prison. This sentence was the outcome of a plea deal; afterward, Melaku retained new counsel and was diagnosed with schizophrenia, but decided to stick with the plea deal.

References

The Pentagon
Arlington County, Virginia
Prince William County, Virginia
Crimes in Virginia
2010 in Virginia
Attacks in the United States in 2010
October 2010 crimes in the United States
November 2010 crimes in the United States